Salvini may refer to
 Salvini (surname)
 Matteo Salvini, former Italian deputy prime minister
 Us with Salvini, a populist political party founded by him
 Adelson e Salvini (Adelson and Salvini), a three-act opera semi-seria composed by Vincenzo Bellini
 The specific epithet in some scientific names of species, such as Salvin's curassow, Salvin's prion and others